This is a list of airlines in Ethiopia that are currently operating.

See also 
List of airlines
List of defunct airlines of Ethiopia

 
Airlines
Ethiopia
Airlines
Ethiopia